Edmond Michelet (8 October 1899 – 9 October 1970) was a French politician. He is the father of the writer Claude Michelet.

On 17 June 1940, he distributed tracts calling to continue the war in all Brive-la-Gaillarde's mailboxes. It is considered to be the first act of resistance of World War II in France, one day before Charles de Gaulle's Appeal of 18 June.

He helped many victims of the Nazis in occupied France, including Catholic philosopher Dietrich von Hildebrand. In 1943 he was arrested and incarcerated at the Dachau concentration camp where he assisted other prisoners during a typhus epidemic and was infected himself. He wore the armband No. 52579 When Dachau was liberated he was still aiding the sick and was the last to leave, on 26 May 1945. (While a prisoner, he was helped by abbé Franz Stock.). He was designated a righteous among the nations in 1995. 

He was elected to the French Parliament on 21 October 1945.      
He was made minister of the Army by Charles de Gaulle in 1946.

He served as Minister of Justice from 1959 to 1961.

Michelet was the main collaborator of Abraham Vereide, the leader of the Family fundamentalist organisation, based in the United States.

References

Further reading 

Edmond Michelet.Rue de La Liberté. Dachau 1943–1945. Seuil: Paris, 1955, 1983.
Alice von Hildebrand. The Soul of A Lion. A Biography. Ignatius Press, 2000, 
Serge Besanger. Les Indomptables. Edmond et Marie Michelet. Nouvelle Cité, 2020,

External links
 

1899 births
1970 deaths
Politicians from Paris
Popular Republican Movement politicians
Rally of the French People politicians
Union of Democrats for the Republic politicians
French Ministers of Culture
French Ministers of Justice
French Ministers of Veterans Affairs
French Ministers of Civil Service
Members of the Constituent Assembly of France (1945)
Members of the Constituent Assembly of France (1946)
Deputies of the 1st National Assembly of the French Fourth Republic
French Senators of the Fourth Republic
Senators of Seine (department)
Deputies of the 3rd National Assembly of the French Fifth Republic
Deputies of the 4th National Assembly of the French Fifth Republic
Dachau concentration camp survivors
French people of the Algerian War
Commandeurs of the Légion d'honneur
Recipients of the Croix de Guerre 1939–1945 (France)
Recipients of the Resistance Medal
French Righteous Among the Nations
French Servants of God